The 1975 NCAA Division I men's ice hockey tournament was the culmination of the 1974–75 NCAA Division I men's ice hockey season, the 28th such tournament in NCAA history. It was held between March 13 and 15, 1975, and concluded with Michigan Tech defeating Minnesota 6-1. All games were played at the St. Louis Arena in St. Louis, Missouri.

This is the first time since 1949 that all four teams in the tournament had played in the previous championship. It has not happened since (as of 2017).

Qualifying teams
Four teams qualified for the tournament, two each from the eastern and western regions. The ECAC tournament champion and the two WCHA tournament co-champions received automatic bids into the tournament. An at-large bid was offered to a second eastern team based upon both their ECAC tournament finish as well as their regular season record.

Format
The ECAC champion was seeded as the top eastern team while the WCHA co-champion with the better regular season record was given the top western seed. The second eastern seed was slotted to play the top western seed and vice versa. All games were played at the St. Louis Arena. All matches were Single-game eliminations with the semifinal winners advancing to the national championship game and the losers playing in a consolation game.

Bracket

Note: * denotes overtime period(s)

Semifinals

(E1) Boston University vs. (W2) Michigan Tech

(W1) Minnesota vs. (E2) Harvard

Consolation Game

(E1) Boston University vs. (E2) Harvard

National Championship

(W1) Minnesota vs. (W2) Michigan Tech

All-Tournament Team
G: Jim Warden* (Michigan Tech)
D: Reed Larson (Minnesota)
D: Bob Lorimer (Michigan Tech)
F: Bob D'Alvise (Michigan Tech)
F: Steve Jensen (Michigan Tech)
F: Warren Miller (Minnesota)
* Most Outstanding Player(s)

References

Tournament
NCAA Division I men's ice hockey tournament
NCAA Division I Men's Ice Hockey Tournament
NCAA Division I Men's Ice Hockey Tournament
1970s in St. Louis
Ice hockey competitions in St. Louis